Gov. João Durval Carneiro Airport  (Formerly ICAO: SNJD) is the airport serving Feira de Santana, Brazil. It is named after a former Governor of the state of Bahia, born in 1929.
 
It is operated by the concessionary Aeroporto de Feira de Santana (FSA).

History
The airport was commissioned in 1985 and since May 29, 2012 operated by the concessionary Aeroporto Feira de Santana formed by UTC Engineering and Sinart.

Airlines and destinations

Access

See also

List of airports in Brazil

References

External links

Airports in Bahia
Airports established in 1985
Feira de Santana
1985 establishments in Brazil